Sam Yip Kam-Lung (Chinese: 葉錦龍, born 24 August 1987) is a pro-democracy politician in Hong Kong. He was the District Councillor for the Shek Tong Tsui constituency of Hong Kong's Central and Western District Council, one of the founders of Island West Dynamic Movement, host for internet podcast HKpeanut and event supervisor for ACGHK.

Early life and education 
Yip was born in Hong Kong in 1987 and was raised in the district of Sai Ying Pun. He studied at St. Louis School (Primary Section) and King's College. Since a young age, Yip has been passionate about transportation vehicles, especially buses, the MTR, and airplanes. This adoration towards airplanes led him to study aircraft maintenance in the Hong Kong Institute of Vocational Education

Being a Japanese anime enthusiast, Yip has self-taught Japanese and taken JLPT exams. With the help of his boss at his part-time job, he joined a Japanese-funded company that specializes in organizing concerts. After taking a working holiday in Japan, he returned to Hong Kong as a project consultant and event supervisor for Creative Paradise of ACGHK.

Political Inspiration 
When Yip was in secondary school, he had loved Chinese History and pay close attention to local issues. Inspired by the protest for preservation of Queen's Pier in 2004, Yip started to enthusiastically participated in social movements.

Political career

Establishment of Island West Dynamic Movement 
In November 2014, Yip, Ng Wing-Tak, and Ed Lau founded Island West Dynamic Movement, an organisation focused on social issues in Sai Wan (Western District].

2015 District Council Elections 
In 2015, Yip stood for 2015 District Council elections in Shek Tong Tsui (constituency). He lost the seat with 41.31% (1,336) of the vote.

2019 District Council Elections 
Running as a non-partisan candidate for the 2019 elections, he won the seat with 55.27% (3,087) of the vote. From February 2016, Sam Yip ran a 'shadow' district
council to "host community photography classes, set up mobile book exchange
counters, and teach senior citizens how to use mobile phones (whilst filtering
“fake news” circulating on their Whatsapp groups). The venue was also opened up
to NGOs."

Unlawful Arrest and Detainment by Hong Kong Police 
In the protests against National Anthem Ordinance, 24 May 2019, Yip was under arrest while encountering excessive force by Hong Kong police. During arrest, Yip was kneeled on the neck and seriously injured.

Corporation with Japanese Politicians 
In 26 February 2020, Yip visited Japan and met the members of the House of Representatives, the National Diet of Japan, and political figures. During meetings, he rose concerns over the situation of Hong Kong people on Diamond Princess (ship) and indicated the demands of those people. Besides, Yip also discussed the topic about infection control policy of Hong Kong Government, shortage of surgical masks in Hong Kong and the issue of Hong Kong democratization with Japanese parliament members.

References

Living people
Independent politicians in Hong Kong
District councillors of Central and Western District
1987 births